Makarovsky (masculine), Makarovskaya (feminine), or Makarovskoye (neuter) is the name of several  rural localities in Russia.

Republic of Dagestan
As of 2010, one rural locality in the Republic of Dagestan bears this name:
Makarovskoye, Republic of Dagestan, a selo in Bolsheareshevsky Selsoviet of Kizlyarsky District

Irkutsk Oblast
As of 2010, one rural locality in Irkutsk Oblast bears this name:
Makarovskaya, Irkutsk Oblast, a farmstead in Bokhansky District

Ivanovo Oblast
As of 2010, one rural locality in Ivanovo Oblast bears this name:
Makarovskoye, Ivanovo Oblast, a selo in Lukhsky District

Kaluga Oblast
As of 2010, one rural locality in Kaluga Oblast bears this name:
Makarovsky, Kaluga Oblast, a settlement in Khvastovichsky District

Kirov Oblast
As of 2010, one rural locality in Kirov Oblast bears this name:
Makarovskaya, Kirov Oblast, a village in Pashinsky Rural Okrug of Afanasyevsky District

Kostroma Oblast
As of 2010, one rural locality in Kostroma Oblast bears this name:
Makarovskaya, Kostroma Oblast, a village in Petropavlovskoye Settlement of Pavinsky District

Oryol Oblast
As of 2010, one rural locality in Oryol Oblast bears this name:
Makarovsky, Oryol Oblast, a settlement in Abolmasovsky Selsoviet of Khotynetsky District

Rostov Oblast
As of 2010, one rural locality in Rostov Oblast bears this name:
Makarovsky, Rostov Oblast, a khutor in Verkhnyakovskoye Rural Settlement of Verkhnedonskoy District

Tver Oblast
As of 2010, two rural localities in Tver Oblast bear this name:
Makarovskoye, Sandovsky District, Tver Oblast, a village in Sandovsky District
Makarovskoye, Sonkovsky District, Tver Oblast, a village in Sonkovsky District

Volgograd Oblast
As of 2010, two rural localities in Volgograd Oblast bear this name:
Makarovsky, Chernyshkovsky District, Volgograd Oblast, a khutor in Krasnoyarsky Selsoviet of Chernyshkovsky District
Makarovsky, Uryupinsky District, Volgograd Oblast, a khutor in Rossoshinsky Selsoviet of Uryupinsky District

Vologda Oblast
As of 2010, ten rural localities in Vologda Oblast bear this name:
Makarovsky, Vologda Oblast, a settlement in Verkhnekemsky Selsoviet of Nikolsky District
Makarovskaya, Babayevsky District, Vologda Oblast, a village in Borisovsky Selsoviet of Babayevsky District
Makarovskaya, Kharovsky District, Vologda Oblast, a village in Slobodskoy Selsoviet of Kharovsky District
Makarovskaya, Kirillovsky District, Vologda Oblast, a village in Aleshinsky Selsoviet of Kirillovsky District
Makarovskaya, Dvinitsky Selsoviet, Syamzhensky District, Vologda Oblast, a village in Dvinitsky Selsoviet of Syamzhensky District
Makarovskaya, Ustretsky Selsoviet, Syamzhensky District, Vologda Oblast, a village in Ustretsky Selsoviet of Syamzhensky District
Makarovskaya, Lokhotsky Selsoviet, Tarnogsky District, Vologda Oblast, a village in Lokhotsky Selsoviet of Tarnogsky District
Makarovskaya, Nizhnespassky Selsoviet, Tarnogsky District, Vologda Oblast, a village in Nizhnespassky Selsoviet of Tarnogsky District
Makarovskaya, Verkhovsky Selsoviet, Tarnogsky District, Vologda Oblast, a village in Verkhovsky Selsoviet of Tarnogsky District
Makarovskaya, Verkhovazhsky District, Vologda Oblast, a village in Shelotsky Selsoviet of Verkhovazhsky District

Voronezh Oblast
As of 2010, one rural locality in Voronezh Oblast bears this name:
Makarovsky, Voronezh Oblast, a settlement in Nizhnekamenskoye Rural Settlement of Talovsky District

Yaroslavl Oblast
As of 2010, two rural localities in Yaroslavl Oblast bear this name:
Makarovskaya, Myshkinsky District, Yaroslavl Oblast, a village in Florovsky Rural Okrug of Myshkinsky District
Makarovskaya, Nekouzsky District, Yaroslavl Oblast, a village in Shestikhinsky Rural Okrug of Nekouzsky District